Nimpkish is an anglicization of the name of the 'Namgis subgroup of the Kwakwaka'wakw peoples.  It can refer to:
MV Nimpkish, a 1973 BC Ferry
the Nimpkish River
Lower Nimpkish Provincial Park, a part in the river's lower basin
Nimpkish Lake, a lake in the river's basin
Nimpkish Lake Provincial Park, a provincial park on the southwest shores of that lake
Nimpkish First Nation is an old transliteration of the band government now known as the Namgis First Nation
Nimpkish Indian Reserve No. 2, an Indian reserve governed by the ‘Namgis First Nation
, a bank or shoal offshore from the mouth of the Nimpkish River
Nimpkish Camp, a former logging community at the southeast end of Nimpkish Lake
Nimpkish Heights, a locality near the mouth of the Nimpkish River